WestJet serves 109 destinations in 24 countries.

The following is a list of destinations currently served by WestJet, WestJet Encore and WestJet Link.

WestJet destinations

WestJet Encore destinations

WestJet Link destinations

Terminated destinations

References

External links
WestJet's official website
WestJet's route map

WestJet
WestJet